Pablo Oscar Rotchen Suárez (born 23 April 1973 in Buenos Aires) is a retired Argentine football defender who played for the Argentina national team in Copa América 1997.

Rotchen started his professional career playing for Club Atlético Independiente on November 22, 1992, in a 1–0 away win against Boca Juniors in the Bombonera. From there he went on to make over 200 appearances for the club in all competitions.

Rotchen helped Independiente to win the Clausura 1994 championship. They also won the Supercopa Sudamericana in 1994 and 1995 and the Recopa Sudamericana in 1995.

Rotchen joined RCD Espanyol in 1999 and was part of the squad that won the Copa del Rey in 2000.

In 2002, he joined team Monterrey where he was part of the squad that won the Clausura 2003 championship. He retired in 2005.

Honours
 Independiente
Primera División Argentina: Clausura 1994
Supercopa Sudamericana: 1994, 1995
Recopa Sudamericana: 1995

 Espanyol
Copa del Rey: 1999–2000

 Monterrey
La Primera División: Clausura 2003

External links
 
 ES Mas profile
 Argentine Primera statistics

1973 births
Living people
Footballers from Buenos Aires
Argentine footballers
Argentine expatriate footballers
Association football defenders
Club Atlético Independiente footballers
RCD Espanyol footballers
C.F. Monterrey players
Argentine Primera División players
La Liga players
Liga MX players
Expatriate footballers in Spain
Expatriate footballers in Mexico
Argentine expatriate sportspeople in Mexico
Argentine expatriate sportspeople in Spain
Argentina international footballers
1995 King Fahd Cup players
1997 Copa América players
Pan American Games gold medalists for Argentina
Pan American Games medalists in football
Footballers at the 1995 Pan American Games
Medalists at the 1995 Pan American Games